Flower In The Pocket is a 2007 Malaysian independent film directed by Liew Seng Tat. The film is produced by Da Huang Pictures.

Plot
Li Ahh (Lim Ming Wei) and Li Ohm (Wong Zi Jiang) grow up motherless. Their father Sui (James Lee) is a workaholic who spends most of his time mending broken mannequins. Sui is an outsider to the two boys, the only legacy left by the woman he loved, or still loves.

While he shuts himself out from the world, the two brothers grow up with all the freedom of neglected children. They roam the streets; get into fights and other trouble in school. Along the way, they adopt a stray puppy, which becomes the most important thing in their lives.

When the puppy is sent away for being a nuisance, the boys are devastated. Sui is very much affected by his boys' strong emotional attachment to the puppy. For the very first time, he realises that he is still able to love and he's going to do something about it before it's too late.

Cast
 Wong Zi Jiang as Ma Li Ohm
 Lim Ming Wei as Ma Li Ahh
 Amira Nasuha Shahiran as Atan/Ayu
 James Lee as Ah Sui
 Azman Md. Hasan as Mamat

Quotes
“A touching and humanistic story that tells a neglected father-and-sons relationship with a sense of humour, while using a simply and beautifully composed cinematic style.”
 Dariush MEHRJUIM, Head of Jury & Iranian master cineaste, 12th Pusan International Film Festival

“Flower In The Pocket is constantly, quietly, astonishing. A little film with big, deep pockets, Flower is equal parts childhood idyll, absurdist comedy, gentle social satire and family mystery.”
 Shelly Kraicer, Film Programmer of Vancouver Film Festival

Awards
 New Current Award, 12th Pusan International Film Festival 2007
 KNN Audience Award, 12th Pusan International Film Festival 2007
 VPRO Tiger Award, 37th International Film Festival Rotterdam 2008
 «Le Regard d’Or» (Golden Gaze) Award, 22nd Fribourg International Film Festival 2008
 Jury prize (Lotus du Jury), 10th Deauville Asian Film Festival 2008

References

External links
 The Hollywood Reporter review
 Variety review
 Flower In The Pocket DVD Da Huang Pictures
 

2007 films
Malay-language films
Chinese-language Malaysian films
Malaysian independent films
2007 independent films
Films directed by Liew Seng Tat
Da Huang Pictures films
Films with screenplays by Liew Seng Tat
Cantonese-language Malaysian films
2007 directorial debut films